Cherry Grove may refer to:

United States

 Cherry Grove, Indiana, an unincorporated community
 Cherry Grove Cemetery, in McVey Memorial Forest, Indiana
 Cherry Grove (Woodbine, Maryland), a farm
 Cherry Grove Township, Michigan, a township
 Cherry Grove, Minnesota, an unincorporated community
 Cherry Grove Township, Goodhue County, Minnesota
 Cherry Grove (Crystal Springs, Mississippi), in the National Register of Historic Places listings in Mississippi
 Cherry Grove Plantation, Natchez, Mississippi
 Cherry Grove, New York, an unincorporated hamlet
 Cherry Grove, Caswell County, North Carolina, an unincorporated community
 Cherry Grove, Columbus County, North Carolina, an unincorporated community
 Cherry Grove Beach, South Carolina, a neighborhood of the city of North Myrtle Beach sometimes known as Cherry Grove
 Cherry Grove, Ohio, a census-designated place
 Cherry Grove, Oregon, an unincorporated community
 Cherry Grove Township, Warren County, Pennsylvania
 Cherry Grove, Washington, a census-designated place 
 Cherry Grove, West Virginia, an unincorporated community

Canada
 Cherry Grove, Alberta, a hamlet
 Cherry Grove, Ontario, a community in the municipality of Thames Centre

Barbados
 Cherry Grove, Barbados, a populated place

See also
 Cherry Grove-Shannon Township, Carroll County, Illinois